The Charles Jordan Community Center is a community center in Portland, Oregon's Portsmouth neighborhood, maintained by Portland Parks & Recreation. The center is named after Charles Jordan.

See also

 List of sports venues in Portland, Oregon

References

Community centers in the United States
Portsmouth, Portland, Oregon